Pablo Lopez or López may refer to:

Sports
Pablo López (footballer, born 1982), Argentine footballer
Pablo López (footballer, born 1998), Mexican footballer
Pablo Sebastián López, Argentine political activist
Pablo López (baseball), baseball player

Fictional characters
Pablo Lopez, character in Mi calle
Pablo Lopez, character in La Casa de al Lado

Music
Pablo López (singer), Spanish singer